Berdychiv Raion is a raion (district) of Zhytomyr Oblast, northern Ukraine. Its administrative centre is located at Berdychiv. Population: 

On 18 July 2020, as part of the administrative reform of Ukraine, the number of raions of Zhytomyr Oblast was reduced to four, and the area of Berdychiv Raion was significantly expanded. The January 2020 estimate of the raion population was

Natural tourist objects 

Demchynskyi and Rayhorodskiy park-memorials landscape of gardening art of local value, hydro-recreation resource of the river Hnylopiat.

The natives of the district 

 figure of the Polish national movement Edmund Różycki (vil. Ahativka)
 doctor of Economic I.Oliynyk
 opera singer G.Shapovalov (vil. Zhurbyntsi)
 rector of Zhytomyr pedagogical institute P. Gornostai (vil. Ivankivtsi)
 doctor of Biological S. Markevych (vil. Katerynivka)
 doctor of Philological P.Bilous
 Honored  trainer of the USSR V.Lonskyi (vil. Obukhivka)
 poet M. Pasichnyk (vil. Polovetske)
 bibliographer and literary critic M.Gumenyuk (vil. Reia)
 the Doctor of engineering, general I. Oliynyk (vil. Skraglivka)
 doctor of Arts and Philosophy D. Stepovyk, (vil. Slobodshche)
 doctor of biological Ye. Kondratyuk (vil. Old Solotvyn)
 classic of English literature Joseph Conrad
 author, memorialist Stefan Borovskyi (s. Terekhove)
 corresponding member of Academy of Science of the USSR
 a physicist, Hero of the Soviet Union V. Mostovyi (s. Khazhyn)

References

External links
 Find out Berdychiv District @ Ukrainian.Travel {en}

Raions of Zhytomyr Oblast
 
1925 establishments in Ukraine